KTLN-TV (channel 68) is a television station licensed to Palo Alto, California, United States, serving the San Francisco Bay Area as an owned-and-operated station of the classic television network Heroes & Icons. It is owned by Weigel Broadcasting alongside San Jose-licensed low-power, Class A Decades owned-and-operated station KAXT-CD (channel 1). Both stations share studios on Pelican Way in San Rafael, and transmitter facilities on Mount Allison.

Even though KTLN-TV is licensed as a full-power station, it shares spectrum with KAXT-CD, whose low-power broadcasting radius does not cover all of the San Francisco Bay Area. Therefore, it relies on cable and satellite carriage to reach the entire market. However, KTLN-TV shares MeTV with CW affiliate KBCW's (channel 44) third subchannel, which has a stronger signal than KTLN.

History

Originally, Christian Communications of Chicagoland (then-owners of WCFC-TV, now Ion Television owned-and-operated station WCPX-TV) owned KTLN outright. It was formerly licensed to the Marin County community of Novato. CCC filed to sell the station to OTA Broadcasting, a company controlled by Michael Dell's MSD Capital, in June 2011. The sale was completed on October 6, 2011; as part of the deal, CCC continued to operate KTLN via a local marketing agreement (LMA).

Weigel Broadcasting agreed to acquire KTLN-TV and KAXT-CD, along with KVOS-TV and KFFV in Seattle, from OTA Broadcasting in a $23.2 million deal on October 18, 2017. The station was temporarily off the air as of June 2018.

The station sale to Weigel was completed on April 15, 2019. At midnight on April 17, KTLN returned on the air carrying high definition signals of Heroes & Icons on 68.1, and MeTV on 68.2.

Technical information

Subchannels
The station's digital signal is multiplexed:

Analog-to-digital conversion
KTLN-TV shut down its analog signal, over UHF channel 68, on June 12, 2009, as part of the federally mandated transition from analog to digital television. The station's digital signal remained on its pre-transition UHF channel 47, using PSIP to display KTLN-TV's virtual channel as 68 on digital television receivers, which was among the high band UHF channels (52-69) that were removed from broadcasting use as a result of the transition.

References

External links

Television channels and stations established in 1998
1998 establishments in California
Heroes & Icons affiliates
MeTV affiliates
Story Television affiliates
TLN-TV
Companies based in San Rafael, California
Weigel Broadcasting